Cool Velvet is a studio album by American saxophonist Stan Getz, recorded and released in 1960 on Verve Records.

Track listing
"The Thrill Is Gone" (Brown, Henderson) – 5:03
"It Never Entered My Mind" (Hart, Rodgers) – 4:06
"Early Autumn" (Burns, Herman, Mercer) – 4:45
"When I Go, I Go All the Way" (Garcia) – 4:00
"A New Town Is a Blue Town" (Adler, Ross) – 2:42
"'Round Midnight" (Hanighen, Monk, Williams) – 3:07
"Born to Be Blue" (Torme, Wells) – 3:53
"Whisper Not" (Golson) – 5:04
"Goodbye" (Jenkins) – 4:24
"Nature Boy (Ahbez) – 3:02

Personnel
Stan Getz - tenor saxophone
Russell Garcia - arranger and conductor
Blanchie Birdsong - harp
Dave Hildinger - vibes
Jan Johansson - piano
Freddy Dutton - bass
Sperie Karas - drums
Unidentified strings

References 

Verve Records albums
Stan Getz albums
1960 albums